Dead Man's Letters, also known as Letters from a Dead Man, is a 1986 Soviet post-apocalyptic drama film directed and written by Konstantin Lopushansky. He wrote it along with Vyacheslav Rybakov and Boris Strugatsky. It marks his directorial debut.

The film was screened at the International Critics' Week section of the Cannes Film Festival in 1987
and received the FIPRESCI prize at the 35th International Filmfestival Mannheim-Heidelberg.

In the aftermath of nuclear apocalypse, a group of people are forced to live underground in bunkers. They cannot go outside their dwellings without wearing protective clothing and gas masks. They try to find hope in the disturbing new world. Among these people is a history teacher who tries to contact via letters his missing son.

Plot
The film is set in a town after a nuclear war; the town is destroyed and polluted with radioactive elements. The main character, Professor Larsen, played by Rolan Bykov, is a Nobel Prize in Physics laureate, who lives in the basement of a museum along with his sick wife and several other people who used to work at the museum. He often writes letters to his son Eric, though he has no way of contacting him. Larsen believes the war has ended and that more surviving humans exist outside the central bunker, but nobody else believes his theories.

Larsen visits an orphanage where the current caretaker of the surviving children explains that she's thinking of evacuating to the central bunker, though may have to leave the children behind as they likely won't be allowed in since they're sick, to Larsen's disapproval. Larsen is informed that he also might be rejected from entering the central bunker due to his old age. With his wife's health declining, Larsen sneaks past several soldiers during curfew hours and attempts to find medicine for his wife, escaping from a military raid in the process. When he returns to the museum's basement, however, he finds that his wife died. The other museum employees bury her body.

In one of his letters to Eric, Larsen tells a darkly humorous story on how someone failed to prevent the nuclear war. According to him, an operator from an electronics center had a chance to cancel the first missile launch (which happened due to a computer error), but was unable to reach the computer in time to abort the launch as he was slowed down by a cup of coffee in his hands. The operator then hung himself in return.

Larsen makes a trip to the central bunker in an effort to find Eric. After sneaking into a medical facility, he enters the children's department, only to find all the children sick, injured, and screaming in agony, much to Larsen's horror.

After returning to the museum's basement, he finds that a museum employee is about to take his life as he thinks the history of mankind has ended and that mankind was doomed from the very beginning. He then leaves the group, lies down in a grave, and shoots himself dead, to the horror of his son. Later, while salvaging books from a flooded library, Larsen talks with a man who disagrees with his theory on how there's hope for mankind, referencing how Jesus said mankind was doomed.

Larsen visits the orphanage where he learns the children were rejected from entering the central bunker. The caretaker leaves the children for Larsen to look after, as she is evacuating to the central bunker herself. The remaining museum employees also evacuate to the central bunker, though Larsen stays behind to look after the children (it's assumed they're the only people left in the town). On Christmas Day, Larsen creates a makeshift Christmas tree out of sticks and candles while the children design Christmas ornaments to decorate it with. In his final letter to Eric, Larsen writes that he finally found purpose in life and that he hopes his son doesn't leave him alone in the world.

The final scene is narrated by one of the children Larsen looked after, who explains that Larsen died some time later. On his deathbed, he told the children to leave the museum and find somewhere else to go while they have the strength, still believing that life exists elsewhere. The film ends with the children wandering through the apocalyptic landscape together, their fates unknown.

Cast
 Rolan Bykov - Professor Larsen
 Vatslav Dvorzhetsky - Pastor
 Vera Mayorova - Anna
 Vadim Lobanov
 Viktor Mikhaylov
 Svetlana Smirnova - Theresa
 Vladimir Bessekernyh
 Vyacheslav Vasiliev - doctor dosimetrist
 Natalya Vlasova

Themes
Due to the heated climate between North America and Russia during the events of The Cold War, many critics believe that Dead Man's Letters is a response to American films like WarGames and The Day After discussing their perspective on the Nuclear Arms Race. TBS purchased the rights to show Dead Man's Letters, deciding to air it alongside Amerika, a twelve-hour ABC miniseries about what the United States would be like as a Soviet satellite state. The heavy reliance on themes like warfare, uncertainty, and grief as well as Americans involved in the war are interwoven through the production design from Yelena Amshinskaya and Viktor Ivanov. The use of defense equipment in the film, including gas masks and shelter equipment,  makes its portrayal of a post-nuclear setting an eerie mirror image of the Soviet program.

Production
Around the time the film started production, it was common knowledge that Russia had a strict censorship policy following the death of Stalin, resulting in a three year waiting period for Lopushansky and the crew consisting of various re-rewrites, possibly most likely due to Vyacheslav Rybakov's involvement with anti-Soviet literature and run-ins with the KGB. However, censorship started to loosen around the mid to late 80s towards discussing sensitive topics regarding current or previous events in Russia's history, so producers and film studios became more lenient with what was shown in cinemas. Gorbachev established a policy of allowing more open discussion of previously sensitive political issues making it possible for well connected civil defense skeptics to popularize their views. The patronage of Anatoly Gromyko-historian, member of the USSR Academy of Sciences, and son of Soviet foreign minister Andrei Gromyko enabled the production by Lenfilm in 1986 of the first portrayal of the aftermath of nuclear war in Soviet cinema. 

Before production started on this film and his short Solo, Lopunshansky served as an apprentice for Tarkovsky and would later work as a production assistant for his 1979 film Stalker. Tarkovsky's teachings played a huge influence on Lopushansky's directing style as well as many aspects of the film from the set design, cinematography, and signature slow yet otherworldly pacing. In a 2017 interview with Indie Cinema, Lopunshansky states  "I noticed that his lectures, in fact, are not about certain professional skills, but are more philosophical, about understanding the essence of art, its essence." This can be seen through the film's brutal realism and constant feelings of hopelessness and confusion, a sentiment shared with by various members of the crew. The use of monochrome coloring on the film stock gives a resemblance to the greenish tint seen in various scenes in Stalker, in order to give the film a more foreboding atmosphere.

Reception
In 1989, The New York Times  published a somewhat positive review of the film. Praising the film for its brutal realism and stunning set design, but found that the film was somewhat dismissed by its meandering in certain scenes stating "despite its technical virtues, seems just a bit too contrived to truly convince, much less to deeply move. Yet, in stripping the ideological gloss from the vision of ultimate calamity, Mr. Lopushinsky does succeed in creating a cultural artifact that makes the specter of the most dreadful possible event common to both sides of the superpower divide".

See also
Vyacheslav Rybakov
List of nuclear holocaust fiction
Nuclear weapons in popular culture

References

External links

1986 films
1986 drama films
1980s science fiction drama films
1980s psychological drama films
1986 directorial debut films
Soviet science fiction drama films
Soviet black-and-white films
1980s Russian-language films
Russian dystopian films
Films directed by Konstantin Lopushansky
Soviet post-apocalyptic films
Anti-nuclear films
Films about nuclear war and weapons
Films set in a fictional country
Lenfilm films
Films set in bunkers